Marianne Kierkemann (born 1950) is a Swedish politician of the Moderate Party. She has been a member of the Riksdag since 2006 and a replacement member of the Riksdag in 2005.

External links 
Marianne Kierkemann at the Riksdag website

Members of the Riksdag from the Moderate Party
Living people
1950 births
Women members of the Riksdag
21st-century Swedish women politicians